Antonín Jan Jungmann, sometimes referred to as  (19 May 1775 – 10 April 1854) was a Czech obstetrician and educator born in Hudlice, Beroun District. He was a younger brother to linguist Josef Jungmann (1773–1847).

In 1811 he was appointed professor of obstetrics to the medical faculty at Prague, and in 1838 he became university rector. He gave lectures in German and Czech, and collaborated with his brother on the latter's linguistic projects. He remained at the University of Prague until his retirement in 1850.

Jungmann was a Czech pioneer of Sanskrit studies, being the author of O sanskrtu (On Sanskrit, 1821).

Medical works 
 Lehrbuch der Geburtshülfe, (1812) – Textbook of obstetrics.
 Das Technische der Geburtshülfe, zum Gebrauche bei Vorlesungen über Operationen, für Mediciner und Wundärzte, (1824) – Technical obstetrics, for use in lectures on surgery for medical students and surgeons. 
 Uměnj porodnické, k užitku ženám při porodu obsluhugjcým, (1827).

References
 translation of "Images from the past of Czech medicine, Prague 1959"
 Parts of this article are based on a translation of the equivalent article from the Czech Wikipedia.

Czech obstetricians
Austrian obstetricians
Academic staff of Charles University
Austrian people of Czech descent
1775 births
1854 deaths